Bazaria pempeliella is a species of snout moth in the genus Bazaria. It was described by Ragonot, in 1893. It is found in Algeria, Morocco, Tunisia, Egypt, Afghanistan, Jordan, the Palestinian Territories, Saudi Arabia, Turkmenistan and the United Arab Emirates.

References

Moths described in 1893
Phycitini
Moths of Africa
Moths of Asia
Taxa named by Émile Louis Ragonot